Peggy Pearce (born Velma Pearce; June 4, 1894 – February 26, 1975) was an American film actress of the silent era. She worked primarily in short subjects at the L-KO Kompany and Keystone Studios. She appeared alongside stars including Charles Chaplin, Roscoe Arbuckle, Billie Ritchie, Slim Summerville, Ford Sterling, and Mabel Normand.

Selected filmography
 The Sea Wolf (1920 film)
 A Tokyo Siren (1920)
 A Good Loser (1920)
 False Evidence (1919)
 Ace of the Saddle (1919)
 Sex (1920)
 Love Madness (1920)
 The Red-Haired Cupid (1918)
 The Golden Fleece (1918)
 His Favorite Pastime (1914)
 Tango Tangles (1914)
 A Film Johnnie (1914) 
 Between Showers (1914)
 Peeping Pete (1913)
 Some Nerve (1913) 
 The Gusher (1913)
 Fatty at San Diego (1913)
 A Quiet Little Wedding (1913)

References

External links

1894 births
1975 deaths
American film actresses
American silent film actresses
20th-century American actresses
Actresses from Long Beach, California